The Colorado-class battleships were a group of four United States Navy super-dreadnoughts, the last of its pre-Treaty battleships. Designed during World War I, their construction overlapped the end of that conflict and continued in its immediate aftermath. As such, the 16" gun Colorado-class ships were the last and most powerful battleships built by the U.S. Navy until the  entered service on the eve of World War II.

The Colorados were the final group of the Standard-type battleships, designed to have similar speed and handling to simplify maneuvers with the line of battle. The cancelled  which was to follow would have in several ways been a departure from this practice.  Apart from an upgrade in striking power with their eight 16-inch guns, the Colorados were essentially repeats of the earlier . The Colorados were also the last American capital ships built with four main armament turrets and twin-mounted guns.

All three ships had extensive careers during World War II. Maryland and West Virginia were both present during the attack on Pearl Harbor on 7 December 1941. While Maryland escaped relatively unscathed, West Virginia was sunk in the shallow waters of the harbor but subsequently raised and repaired. All three ships served as naval gunfire support ships during numerous amphibious operations. Maryland and West Virginia were present at the last surface action between battleships, the Battle of Surigao Strait during the Battle of Leyte Gulf in October 1944. All three ships were placed into the reserve fleet after the end of the war and were scrapped by the late 1950s.

Design
The construction of battleships armed with 16-inch guns was envisioned by the General Board of the United States Navy and Bureau of Construction and Repair (C&R) as early as 1913, as the upgrade in gun caliber promised twice the kinetic energy of the 12-inch gun then in service and half again as much as the 14-inch gun then being introduced. The 14-inch gun dominated the design of battleships between 1913 and 1916, just as the 12-inch gun had dictated designs from 1908 to 1910. However, while the General Board approved the 16-inch gun as early as 1911, George von Lengerke Meyer, the Secretary of the Navy, felt that a move to the larger gun caliber would make capital ships still on the drawing board obsolete. For this reason, he restricted the Bureau of Ordnance to proceed no further than blueprints for the new gun as a hedge against foreign developments. He finally approved construction of this gun in October 1912 and the weapon was test-fired successfully in August 1914. Such a move meant an increase of 8,000 tons per ship, twice as much as the jump from the s to the Pennsylvanias. Debate continued for the next three years. Each year, President Woodrow Wilson's Secretary of the Navy, Josephus Daniels, balked at the potential increase in cost and ordered instead that the design features of the Standard Class be continued, but eventually compromised with the 1917 design battleships by allowing their armament to be upgraded. However, this was the only substantial change permitted.

The design of the Colorado class was therefore adapted from the preceding ; other than the significant improvement of eight /45 caliber guns in four dual turrets taking the place of the Tennessee-class's twelve /50 caliber guns in four triple turrets, there was no major difference between the two designs. This was partly the result of wartime experience, when over 250 destroyers and more than 450 submarine chasers had to be built quickly for service in the North Atlantic. The U.S. Navy had done this by a process almost akin to the assembly line, sticking to one basic design per class with a maximum amount of standardization and rationalization. Since the Naval Act of 1916 meant the imminent construction of 16 battleships and six battlecruisers, it was necessary to streamline production to save time and labor.

Nevertheless, while U.S. battleships were standardized as much as possible, design improvements were incorporated whenever practicable. Most of the changes in the Colorados were incorporated prior to any of their keels being laid. However, plans for the underwater protection—the ships' main defense against torpedoes and shells that fell short of the ship but traveled through the water to hit underneath the waterline—could not be worked out in time. The problem was that tests in caissons—experiments that would eventually prove that a series of compartments divided between being filled with liquid and being left empty would be a very effective defense against torpedoes—were not yet complete. In order to commence construction of the ships as soon as possible, proposals sent to shipbuilding corporations noted that if they were selected to build the ships, alterations to the design of the ships three months after their keels were laid must be allowed.

General characteristics
As in the New Mexico and Tennessee classes, they were designed with a clipper bow to help keep the ships dryer in heavy seas, and also kept the secondary armament in the superstructure rather than in the upper hull (Pennsylvania and earlier classes), where the guns had proved to be excessively wet in heavy seas and thus were frequently unusable.

Propulsion
Turbo-electric transmission, which had been used in the prior class, was retained here. Advantages included the ability for the turbines to run at optimum speed without regard to propeller speed, which led to greater fuel economy and range, and an easier sub-division of machinery, which increased the ships' ability to withstand torpedo hits. Each of the four propeller shafts was powered by a 5,424 kilowatt electric motor, fed by two two-phase turbo generators (General Electric for Maryland, Westinghouse for Colorado and West Virginia) rated at 5,000 volts). Eight oil-fired Babcock & Wilcox water-tube boilers, each in its individual compartment, provided steam for the generators.

Armament

Main guns
Development of this weapon had begun in August 1913, using a bored-out and relined  Mark 2 gun, with the promise of twice the muzzle energy of the /50 caliber Mark 7 guns and 50 percent more than the 14-inch /45 caliber weapon used on the New York-class battleships. After an initial proof firing in July 1914 and minor changes, the 16-inch Mark 1 was re-proved in May 1916 and production approved in January 1917. When the Colorados were modernized in the 1930s, these guns were rebuilt per standard navy practice and redesignated 16-inch/45 (40.6 cm) Mark 5 and Mark 8.

Secondary guns
Fourteen /51 caliber Mark 15 guns were installed to defend against enemy destroyers. This was reduced to 12 in 1922. As in the New Mexico and Tennessee classes, these were mounted in unarmored casemates on the main deck, one deck higher than in previous classes, to allow them to be manned in heavy weather if necessary.

In 1942, the Mark 15 guns were replaced on West Virginia with sixteen /38 caliber Mark 12 dual-purpose guns in twin turrets. On Maryland and Colorado ten Mark 15s were retained and augmented with eight 5 in/38 cal Mark 12s in single mountings with protective shields; the twin turrets planned and later installed were at that time in short supply. They had a high rate of fire due to their being hand-loaded but power-rammed and their capability for easy loading at any angle of elevation. The introduction of proximity-fused anti-aircraft shells in 1943 made the 5 in/38 even more potent in this capacity.

Anti-aircraft guns

Four /23 caliber guns were mounted initially for anti-aircraft (AA) defense. This was increased to eight guns in 1922. These weapons were replaced in 1928–1929 with the same number of /25 caliber guns, the first Navy gun designed specifically for AA use. These weapons were supplemented with quadruple-mount (quad) 1.1-inch/75-caliber guns in 1937–1938.

In 1942, the air defense system on these ships was overhauled completely. In addition to her 5 in/38s, they carried sixteen Bofors 40 mm guns in quad mounts and up to thirty-two Oerlikon 20 mm cannons in single mounts.

A second overhaul of AA defense was made between 1944 and 1945, as the Navy had found 20 mm shells too light to stop Japanese kamikaze planes; this plus the higher approach speeds of these planes made these manually-controlled guns obsolete. In their place, more quad 40 mm Bofors mounts were fitted. Maryland eventually carried forty quad 40 mm and eighteen 20 mm guns. Colorados quad 40mm guns were increased to forty but she kept all her 20 mm guns. West Virginia carried forty quad 40 mm and fifty 20 mm guns.

Armor and underwater protection
The "all or nothing" armor scheme introduced in the Nevada-class battleships was continued here, as throughout the Standard-type warships, with armor suite virtually identical to the preceding Tennessee class. Otherwise, the minimum thickness along the belt remained 14 inches.

As with the Tennessees, the Colorados were modernized in the 1930s to improve their staying power. In addition, the eight boilers were moved from their location in previous designs and placed in separate spaces to port and starboard of the turboelectric power plant. This arrangement formed another line of defense, which would allow the ship to sail if one or even an entire side of boilers was incapacitated. A consequence was the chief aesthetic change between the New Mexicos and Tennessees: the single large funnel of the former was replaced by two smaller funnels in the latter. Turret armor was 5" on the roofs, 8 on the sides and rears, and 18 on the faces.

Other improvements imported from the Tennessee class included an attempt to move the forward torpedo room away from the 16-inch gun magazines, as the room was viewed as vulnerable. Also, the design called for the use of external, rather than internal, belt armor so that a "break in the continuity of the side structure" would not exist, which would minimize drag in the water and any corresponding waste of power.

Modifications

With fiscal year 1917 appropriations, bids on the four Colorados were opened on 18 October 1916; though Marylands keel was laid on 24 April 1917, the other three battleships were not until 1919–1920. With the cancellation of the first , the Colorados were the last U.S. battleships to enter service for nearly two decades. They were also the final U.S. battleships to use twin gun turrets—the s and second es had nine 16-inch/45 caliber guns and the s used nine 16 in/50 caliber in three triple turrets.

Inter-war modernization
Plans for modernization of the Tennessee and Colorado classes were made in October 1931, in part to take advantage of loopholes in the Washington Naval Treaty. While reconstruction under this treaty was allowed only to increase protection from air and underwater attack, it could include improvements in fire control and increased elevation for main armament as these items were not listed in the treaty. Also, any changes made inside the hull could be justified as meant to increase protection, even if the outcome meant increased speed or longer operational range, since the term "blister" had been specified to limit changes only outside the hull, such as main armor belt thickness and main gun caliber. Modifications to the secondary battery were also outside the purview of the Washington Treaty.

Included in initial plans was some protection against chemical shells which contained poisonous gas, although the General Board stated in the late 1920s that decontaminating a battleship hit with these shells would not be possible—the ship would have to be scuttled. Also, the deck armor was to be bolstered with -special treatment steel (STS)—which would add  to the displacement of the ships—the armor on the tops of the main turrets was to be made thicker, fire controls were to be improved with the latest technology, and new shells for the main guns were to be designed. Two (later four) quad 1.1-inch guns were to be added, and all of the machinery in place would be removed in favor of newer equipment so that the ships would not lose any speed with the great increase in weight. Anti-torpedo bulges were also to be installed to improve buoyancy but not to increase the ships' beams any greater than  so they could still use the Panama Canal when transferring from the Atlantic to the Pacific and vice verse. These improvements were estimated to cost about $15,000,000 per ship ($71,723,000 total). However, with the country in the throes of the Great Depression, not much money was available for the Navy. Savings of $26,625,000 could be realized by reconditioning the propulsion machinery rather than replacing it, which would lower the ships' speed. Adding protection against chemical shells could be dropped, along with development of the new shells. Nevertheless, the cost-saving elements of the later proposal were later dropped. The Navy asked the Secretary of the Navy to request money in the fiscal year 1933 to modernize the two classes from Congress, but the depression worsened. Although proposals for modifications were still made, plans were put on hold and never carried out.

In the beginning of 1934, the Bureau of Construction and Repair proposed that the "Big Five"—the two Tennessees and three Colorados—be fitted with anti-torpedo bulges so that the ships could benefit from increased buoyancy; because of, among other factors, the normal procedure of leaving port with the maximum amount of fuel possible on board, the five ships were quite overweight and rode low in the water. This made her draft higher—meaning that the ship's waterline was down . Installing these would be a year's worth of work, with each ship spending six months of that in a dry dock—the first month docked so that the hull shape could be determined, the next six sailing while the bulge was built, and the last five back in the dock so it could be added to the ship.

Three years later (1937), the various Navy bureaus held a joint meeting to discuss a possible partial modernization of the Tennessees and Colorados. They were much different than the changes proposed in 1933; there were no provisions for extra deck armor, but many additions and replacements. To gain space for newer fire control systems, the ships were to be reboilered. The main and secondary battery fire controls were to be replaced, including new rangefinders and plotting room instruments for the main, while new Mark 33 anti-aircraft fire control directors were planned. Varying plans for these were complete by October 1938. None was a full reconstruction; costs ranged from $8,094,000 to $38,369,000 per ship. However, as the money for the improvements would lessen the amount available for new battleship construction, and these would be better than any reconstructed old battleship, the Secretary of the Navy rejected these plans in November. Congress did appropriate $6,600,000 in 1939 for some of these improvements, including the bulges.

World War II changes
With the beginning of World War II in Europe, the Navy began to apply lessons learned by the British to U.S. ships. The King Board of 1940–1941 proposed sweeping changes to the secondary armament of the battleships to increase their defense against air attacks. These included the removal of all /25 caliber guns and 5 in/51 in favor of the dual-purpose 5 in/38, the addition of six quad 1.1-inch guns, and the cutting away of superstructure to clear arcs of fire for the new anti-aircraft weapons. An ultimate secondary battery of sixteen 5 in/38 in dual mounts, sixteen Bofors 40 mm in quadruple mounts and eight single Oerlikon 20 mm was called for by the board in 1941, although they were not certain the ships could handle the added weight and it would take a large amount of time in dry dock for these modifications to take place. With these concerns, an interim measure of four quad 1.1-inch guns was proposed by the board; however, the gun was not being produced in any great number very quickly, so a second interim solution was implemented. /50 caliber guns were added to all of the U.S. battleships except for Arizona and Nevada by June 1941; these were replaced on the three battleships in the Atlantic by the quad 1.1-inch guns by November—they received them first because they were closer to a war zone.

As these modifications were carried out upon the various battleships, much additional weight was added onto the already overweight ships, forcing torpedo bulges to be added so that a decent freeboard could be maintained. These would cost $750,000 and around three or four months in a dry dock. The King Board suggested that the deck armor be bolstered and 5 in/38 dual-purpose guns be added, but the Chief of Naval Operations decreed that any major changes such as these had to wait due to the wars raging around the world at the time. The addition of bulges, however, was approved for the "Big Five", with each ship spending three months in dry dock at the Puget Sound Naval Shipyard. Maryland would be first (17 February 1941 to 20 May), followed by West Virginia (10 May to 8 August), Colorado (28 July to 28 October), Tennessee (19 January 1942 to 21 April) and California (16 March to 16 June). However, the estimates for how long the addition of bulges would take were too low; Puget Sound believed that they could complete work on Maryland in 123 calendar days (about four months)—if the work would be given a priority equal to that of s refit and higher than new construction.

Only two of the ships had bulges added to them through this program, Maryland (completed 1 August 1941) and Colorado (26 February 1942); the attack on Pearl Harbor interrupted the refits intended for West Virginia and the two Tennessees. The surprise strike did not touch Colorado, which was at Puget Sound, and did not hurt Maryland very badly; however, West Virginia was severely damaged and needed a major refit at minimum.

Little to no major modifications were made to the two active Colorados in the opening months of the U.S.'s entry into the war; all of the battleships in the Pacific Fleet had a constant order to be ready to sail within 48 hours in case of a Japanese attempt to invade Hawaii or the West Coast and could not be spared for any major yard work. Colorado was hurried through the rest of her refit with the addition of essential items like radar, splinter protection, fourteen Oerlikon 20 mm and four quad 1.1-in guns; Maryland received a similar treatment later, the only difference being sixteen 20 mm guns and no 1.1-in guns. Although tower masts were constructed for Colorado and Maryland and a majority of their aft cage masts were cut down by the ships' crews in the beginning of 1942, the ships could not be spared the time needed to install the new masts. The tower masts were placed into storage and not used until early 1944.

Colorado and Maryland were greatly needed in the war zone, and as such did not undergo a major refit until 1944, although minor additions and removals, mainly to the anti-aircraft weaponry, were made in-between. Throughout the war, both ships saw their anti-aircraft battery changed constantly. Beginning in 1942, they carried eight 5 in/25, four quad 1.1-in guns, a greatly varying number of 20 mm guns, and eight .50 caliber machine guns. In June 1942, Colorado had fourteen 20 mm guns; just five months later, this was upped to twenty-two, with thirty-six temporarily approved for a later time. By February 1943, both Colorado and Maryland had two more quad 1.1-in guns added (for a total of six mounts) and forty-eight total 20 mm guns; a month later she was given an additional ten .50 caliber machine guns. November 1943 saw the removal of two of the single-purpose 5 in/51, the six quad 1.1-in guns, and a small number of 20 mm guns (six on Colorado and eight on Maryland) in favor of thirty-two Bofors 40 mm guns – six quad and two twin.

Both ships finally underwent major refits in 1944. Here their remaining aft cage masts were taken off in favor of the tower masts, the two twin 40 mm replaced by quads, a quadruple 20 mm added, and a new radar fitted. However, no action was taken until Maryland was struck by a kamikaze aircraft. While undergoing repair, eight twin 5 in/38 were added, but nothing else; her conning tower was removed and replaced by a  special-treated steel structure to balance the additional weight of the 5 in guns.

Ships in class

USS Colorado

 was the third ship of the United States Navy named in honor of the 38th state. Her keel was laid down on 29 May 1919 by the New York Shipbuilding Corporation of Camden, New Jersey. She was launched on 22 March 1921 and commissioned on 30 August 1923, Captain R. R. Belknap in command. During her career, Colorado was involved in various ceremonies and fleet exercises, and assisted residents of Long Beach, California following the 1933 earthquake. In 1937, she was one of several ships that searched for Amelia Earhart after she and her plane went missing. Colorado was at Puget Sound undergoing overhaul at the time of the attack on Pearl Harbor on 7 December 1941.

After extensive training maneuvers along the West Coast, Colorado returned to Pearl Harbor in April 1942. From November 1942 to September 1943 she was stationed in the South West Pacific. In November 1943, she participated in operations against the Japanese during both the Gilbert and Marshall Islands campaign and Mariana and Palau Islands campaign, and shelled Luzon and Okinawa in advance of the planned amphibious assaults there. Following the end of World War II Colorado participated in Operation Magic Carpet before being decommissioned in 1947. She was sold for scrap in 1957.

USS Maryland

 was the third ship of the United States Navy to be named in honor of the seventh state. Her keel was laid down on 24 April 1917 by the Newport News Shipbuilding Company of Newport News, Virginia. She was launched on 20 March 1920 and commissioned on 21 July 1921, Captain C.F. Preston in command. During her career she made a goodwill voyage to Australia and New Zealand in 1925, and transported President-elect Herbert Hoover on the Pacific leg of his tour of Latin America in 1928. Throughout the 1920s and 1930s, she served as a mainstay of fleet readiness through multiple training exercises.

In 1940, Maryland changed her base of operations to Pearl Harbor. She was moored at Battleship Row next to Ford Island during the Japanese attack on Pearl Harbor on 7 December 1941. Damaged during the attack, Maryland reported to Puget Sound, where she was repaired and modernized. Maryland supported the amphibious landings during the Battle of Tarawa, and thereafter participated in the Gilbert and Marshall Islands campaign, the Mariana and Palau Islands campaign, the Battle of Peleliu, the Philippines campaign, and the Battle of Okinawa. Following the end of World War II Maryland participated in Operation Magic Carpet before being decommissioned in 1947. She was sold for scrap in 1959.

USS Washington

 was the second ship of the United States Navy named in honor of the 42nd state. Her keel was laid down on 30 June 1919 by the New York Shipbuilding Corporation of Camden, New Jersey.  She was launched on 1 September 1921, but on 8 February 1922, two days after the signing of the Washington Naval Treaty, all construction work ceased on the 75.9% completed dreadnought.

The ship was towed out to sea off the Virginia Capes in November 1924 to be used as a gunnery target. On the first day of testing, the ship was hit by two  torpedoes and three  near-miss bombs with minor damage and a list of three degrees. On that day, the ship had 400 pounds of TNT detonated on board, but she remained afloat. After the test, it was determined that the existing deck armor on battleships was inadequate, and that future battleships should be fitted with triple bottoms.

USS West Virginia

 was the second ship of the United States Navy named in honor of the 35th state. Her keel was laid down on 12 April 1920 by the Newport News Shipbuilding Company of Newport News, Virginia. She was launched on 17 November 1921 and commissioned on 1 December 1923, Captain Thomas J. Senn in command. Despite a grounding incident early in her career West Virginia received high acclaim for gunnery and armor protection, and was involved in exercises to test the defenses of the Hawaiian Islands in the 1930s. Refloated on 17 May 1942, West Virginia received sufficient temporary repairs to sail to Puget Sound for reconstruction and modernization.

In July 1944 she departed Puget Sound and rejoined the Pacific Fleet for combat operations on the eve of the Philippines campaign. In February 1945 West Virginia participated in the Battle of Iwo Jima, initially by preinvasion bombardment, and later by callfire support for the ground forces on the island. Her last combat operations were during the Battle of Okinawa; after the surrender of Japan, she participated in Operation Magic Carpet. Decommissioned in 1947, she was sold for scrap in 1959.

See also

List of ship classes of World War II
Standard-type battleship

References

Notes

Citations

Bibliography

Online sources

External links

 Naval Historical Center 

Battleship classes
 
Turbo-electric steamships